Northeast Forestry University (NEFU), located in Harbin, Heilongjiang Province, is an institution of higher education and research under the jurisdiction of the Ministry of Education of the People's Republic of China. It serves as the largest forestry university in China and a key university within the scope of the national "Double First Class University Plan" and former "211 Project." It is a Chinese state Double First Class University, identified by the Ministry of Education.

History

Founded in 1952, Northeast Forestry University (NEFU) was formed by the combination of both Zhejiang University and Forestry Department of Northeast Agricultural College, and one of the three oldest institutions for forestry education and research all over the country.

Location
Northeast Forestry University is located in the city of Harbin, the center of the region with China's largest state-owned forests. It's campus covers more than 136 hectares with teaching buildings, scientific research laboratories, and practice sites. In addition, there are several practice centers which include the Maoershan Experimental Forestry Center (Maoershan National Forest Park) and the Liangshui Experimental Forestry Center (Liangshui National Nature Reserve). The university makes up a total area of 33,000 hectares.

The 136-hectare campus contains there are 15 dormitories and one dining hall. As a university which has more than 20,000 undergraduate students enrolled, the population density is higher than many other universities in China.

Academics and Research

NEFU is presently a multidisciplinary university with forestry as its leading field and offers a unique specialization in forestry engineering. NEFU has also specializes in forestry-related aspects of agriculture, science, engineering, economy, management, liberal arts and law. The university at present is composed of sixteen schools and two departments. There are five post-doctoral scientific research programs, four first-level and thirty-two second-level doctoral degree programs. In addition, there are also ten first-level, seventy-five second-level master's degree programs, three types of special discipline master's degree programs in nine fields and fifty-seven undergraduate programs. NEFU has two national first-level key disciplines, two national second-level key disciplines, six key disciplines authorized by the State Forestry Administration, two key discipline groups authorized by Heilongjiang Province, four Heilongjiang Provincial first-level key disciplines, and fifteen Heilongjiang Provincial subordinate key disciplines. With the approval of National Planning Commission and Ministry of Education, NEFU runs the national training centers of life science and technology. In addition, NEFU operates the teaching and research centers of basic sciences particularly in biology, which are also approved by the Ministry of Education.

NEFU has a national scientific observation key station (Maoershan forestry ecological system location station), three key laboratories of Ministry of Education, four key laboratories of the State Forestry Administration, and forty-nine research institutions. There are also nine practice sites within the school, including the Maoershan Experimental Forestry Center and Liangshui Experimental Forestry Center and 180 bases outside the school.

Key Disciplines

First grade of National key disciplines

Forestry

 Forest Tree Genetics and Breeding
 Silviculture
 Forest Protection
 Forest Management
 Wildlife Conservation and Utilization
 Ornamental Plants and Horticulture
 Soil and Water Conservation and Desertification Controlling

Forest Engineering

 Forest Engineering
 Wood Science and Technology
 Chemical Processing Engineering of Forest Products

Second Grade of National Key Disciplines
 Botany
 Ecology

Key Disciplines of State Forestry Administration
 Forest Tree Genetics and Breeding
 Silviculture
 Forest Management
 Ornamental Plants and Horticulture
 Chemical Processing Engineering of Forest Products
 Forestry Economics and Management

Key Disciplines of Heilongjiang Province

Provincial Key Discipline Groups

 Forestry
 Biology Material Science and Technology

Provincial First-level Key Disciplines

 Biology
 Forestry
 Forest Engineering
 Agricultural and Forestry Economics and Management

Provincial Second-level Key Disciplines

 Population, Resources and Environmental Economics
 Chemistry and Physics of Polymers
 Cell Biology
 Biochemistry and Molecular Biology
 Computer Applied Technology
 Chemical Processing Engineering of Forest Products
 Biomaterial Engineering
 Forest Tree Genetics and Breeding
 Silviculture
 Forest Management
 Horticulture
 Soil and Water Conservation and Desertification Controlling
 Biomedical Engineering
 Corporate Management
 Accounting

Key Laboratories
 Key Laboratory of Forest Plant Ecology, Ministry of Education * Key Laboratory of Bio-Based Material Science and Technology
 Key Laboratory of Forest Tree Genetic Improvement and Biotechnology, Ministry of Education

Research Centers and Institutes
 National Base for Cultivating People of Life Science and Technology
 National Base for Cultivating People of Base Science Research and Teaching (Biology Major)
 Maoershan Experimental Forestry Center
 Liangshui Experimental Forestry Center
 Forestry Demonstration Base of Harbin

Academic Periodicals
 Journal of Northeast Forestry University
 Wildlife
 Green Financial Affairs and Accounting
 Chinese Forestry Economy
 Forest Engineering
 Journal of Forestry Research 
 Bulletin of Botanical Research

Faculty
The university has 1,269 full-time teachers.

National Academician
 Ma, Jianzhang 马建章; Distinguished expert of wildlife ecology and management resources.
 Li, Jian 李坚; Distinguished expert of wood science
 Song, Zhanqian 宋湛谦; Distinguished expert of forestry engineering and chemical processing of forest products
 Tang, Shouzheng 唐守正; Distinguished expert of forest management and forest statistics
 Fang, Zhiyuan 方智远; Distinguished expert of vegetable heredity breeding
 Sun, Tieheng 孙铁珩; Distinguished expert of pollution ecology and environmental engineering
 Feng, Zongwei 冯宗炜; Distinguished expert of ecology
 Xia, Xianzhu 夏咸柱; Distinguished expert of zoopathology

Northeast Forestry University Exchange Program
  The University of Adelaide, Australia
  University of Helsinki, Finland
  University of Turku, Finland
  University of Eastern Finland, Finland
  Kymenlaakson ammattikorkeakoulu, University of Applied Sciences, Finland 
  The Ecole Supérieure du Bois, France 
  Blagoveschensk State Pedagogical University, Russia
  Bauman Moscow State Technical University, Russia
  Ural State University, Russia
  Vladivostok State University of Economics and Service, Russia
  Ehime University, Japan
  Kagawa University, Japan
  Kitami Institute of Technology, Japan
  Kochi University, Japan
  Shimane University, Japan
  Waseda University, Japan
  Kangwon National University, South Korea
  National Chung Hsing University, Taiwan
  National Dong Hwa University, Taiwan 
  National Taipei University, Taiwan
  I-Shou University, Taiwan
  Tunghai University, Taiwan
  Chinese Culture University, Taiwan
  National Pingtung University, Taiwan
  National Taichung University of Education, Taiwan
  Chaoyang University of Technology, Taiwan
  Mississippi State University, United States
  University of Colorado Denver, United States
  Purdue University Calumet, United States
  Bangor University, United Kingdom
  University of Exeter, United Kingdom

Chinese Program
Chinese Training Center of Northeast Forestry University offers courses on different levels for overseas students, including oral Chinese, listening, Chinese literature, writing, international trade, intensive reading and HSK Training. The Center has basic, elementary, intermediate, and advanced-level classes, as well as short-term classes.

Colleges and Departments

 College of Forestry
 College of Wildlife Resources
 College of Electromechanical Engineering
 College of Humanities and Social Sciences
 College of Information and Computer Engineering
 College of Life Science
 College of Vocation and Technique
 College of Forest Economics and Management
 College of Landscape Architecture
 College of Material Science and Engineering
 College of Civil Engineering
 College of Sciences 
 College of Foreign Languages
 College of Engineering and Technology
 College of Traffic
 College of Continuing Education
 Physical Education Department

Outstanding alumni
Wan, Gang 万钢; Minister of Science and Technology of the People's Republic of China

Zhang, Yi 张毅; Former director of the State-owned Assets Supervision and Administration Commission

List of presidents
Liu, Chengdong 刘成栋 (1952–1963)
Yang, Xianjin 杨衔晋 (1979–1983)
Xiu, Guohan 修国翰 (1983–1985, 1985–1989)
Zhu, Guoxi 朱国玺 (1990–1995)
Li, Jian 李坚 (1996–2007)
Yang, Chuanping 杨传平 (2007 -2017 )
Li, Bin 李斌  (2017- )

See also
List of forestry universities and colleges

References

Universities and colleges in Heilongjiang
Universities and colleges in Harbin
Forestry education
Educational institutions established in 1952
Forestry in China
1952 establishments in China